DD Bihar is a state owned TV channel telecasting from Doordarshan Kendra Bihar.

Doordarshan Kendra, Patna was inaugurated on 13 October 1990 with an interim set up converting a Government Quarter located at Chhajubagh, Patna. Adjacent area was demarcated for the construction of a full-fledged studio. The new studio building with all the modern equipment and accessories was finally inaugurated on 15 March 1996.

The new Studio Complex at Chhajubagh, Patna started working in March 1999. The Main Studio is having approximately 400 sq. meter areas.

History

List of programmes

Technology

See also DD sister channels
 List of programs broadcast by DD National
 All India Radio
 Ministry of Information and Broadcasting
 DD Direct Plus
 List of South Asian television channels by country

External links
 Doordarshan Official Internet site
 Doordarshan news site
 An article at PFC

References 

Doordarshan
Foreign television channels broadcasting in the United Kingdom
Television channels and stations established in 1994
Direct broadcast satellite services
Indian direct broadcast satellite services
Television stations in Patna
Organisations based in Patna
Mass media in Bihar
1994 establishments in Bihar